Johanna Cecilia Westman (born 11 August 1969 in Tranås, Sweden) is a Swedish children's book author and television host. She presented the 3rd semifinal of Melodifestivalen 2005.

Bibliography

Children's books
1999 - Resor med Byron (illustrator: Charlotte Ramel)
2000 - Jesus och jag - Byrons berättelser (illustrator: Charlotte Ramel)

Cookbooks
2001 - Födelsedagsboken med recept på 12 bakelser
2001 - Första kokboken (illustrator: Catharina Tham, photographer: Eva Ankarvall)
2003 - Första bakboken (illustrator: Catharina Tham, photographer: Eva Ankarvall)
2004 - Första kokboken i världen (illustrator: Catharina Tham, photographer: Eva Ankarvall)
2005 - Italienskt! Hemma hos Johanna (illustrator: Cecilia Nilson, photographer: Klas Hjertberg)
2006 - Minsta kokboken (with Astrid Bobo Gandini, photographer: Eva Ankarvall, designer: Sarah Sheppard)
2007 - Första och andra mosboken (illustrator: Kenneth Andersson, designer: Ebba Bonde)
2008 - Julgodis för stora och små sockerbagare (photographer: Eva Ankarvall)
2009 - Nya första kokboken (illustrator: Catharina Tham, photographer: Eva Ankarvall)

References

External links
Internet Movie Database 
Personal website

Swedish children's writers
Swedish women children's writers
Swedish-language writers
Living people
1969 births
Swedish television hosts
People from Tranås Municipality
20th-century Swedish women writers
21st-century Swedish women writers
Women cookbook writers
Swedish women television presenters